Paul Nizon (born 19 December 1929 in Bern) is a Swiss art historian and writer.

Biography
The son of a Russian chemist and a Swiss mother, after leaving school he studied history of art, classical archaeology and German language and literature in the universities of Berne and Munich. He obtained his doctorate in 1957 with a thesis on Vincent van Gogh. He worked as an assistant at the Historisches Museum in Berne until 1959. In 1960, he was awarded a scholarship at the Swiss Institute in Rome. In 1961, he was a leading art critic of the Neue Zürcher Zeitung. Since 1962 Nizon, who has lived in Paris since 1977, has been a freelance writer. He has held various guest lectureships, including in 1984 in the University of Frankfurt am Main and 1987 in Washington University in St. Louis. Nizon's estate is archived in the Swiss Literary Archives in Bern.

Awards
Source:

 Gert-Jonke-Preis 2017
 Schweizer Grand Prix Literatur 2014
 Literaturpreis des Kantons Bern 2012
 Austrian State Prize for European Literature 2010
 Kranichsteiner Literaturpreis 2007
 Buchpreis des Kantons Bern 2006
 Buchpreis der Stadt Bern für Das Fell der Forelle 2005
 Erich Fried Prize, Vienna 1996
 Großer Literaturpreis des Kantons Bern 1994
 Literaturpreis der Stadt Bern 1994
 Stadtschreiber von Bergen 1993
 Literaturpreis der Stadt Zürich 1992
 Marie-Luise-Kaschnitz-Preis 1990
 Torcello-Preis der Peter Suhrkamp Stiftung 1989
 France Culture Channel Award for Foreign Literature 1988
 Chevalier Ordre des Arts et des Lettres 1988
 Literaturpreis der Stadt Bern 1984
 Deutscher Kritikerpreis für Literatur 1982
 Preis der Schweizerischen Schillerstiftung 1982
 Literaturpreis der Freien Hansestadt Bremen 1975
 Conrad Ferdinand Meyer Preis 1972

See also
 Jean-Louis de Rambures, whose translations introduced Nizon to a French readership

References

Further reading

External links
Literary estate of Paul Nizon in the archive database HelveticArchives of the Swiss National Library
Publications by and about Paul Nizon in the catalogue Helveticat of the Swiss National Library
list of works translated into French
 Interview with P. Nizon (in German)

Swiss art historians
Swiss writers
Ludwig Maximilian University of Munich alumni
Swiss people of Russian descent
Writers from Bern
1929 births
Living people
Washington University in St. Louis faculty
Academic staff of Goethe University Frankfurt
University of Bern alumni